HMAS Toorie was an auxiliary minesweeper operated by the Royal Australian Navy (RAN) during World War II.

Built in 1925 by the Walsh Island Dockyard and Engineering Works, Newcastle for Dorman Long, Sydney as Sir Arthur Dorman. She was sold in 1928 to the Adelaide Steamship Company ownership and renamed Toorie. She was utilised along the Queensland coast as a sugar lighter between shore to larger vessels offshore. Toorie requisitioned by the RAN in late 1940 and commissioned on 14 January 1941 as an auxiliary minesweeper. She was decommissioned in January 1943 and returned to her owners after reconversion work.

Fate
Toorie was sold in 1956 and scrapped in Hong Kong.

Notes

1925 ships
Ships built in New South Wales
Auxiliary ships of the Royal Australian Navy
Minesweepers of the Royal Australian Navy
Iron and steel steamships of Australia
Coastal trading vessels of Australia